A  black legend is a historiographical phenomenon in which a sustained trend in historical writing of biased reporting and introduction of fabricated, exaggerated and/or decontextualized facts is directed against particular persons, nations or institutions with the intention of creating a distorted and uniquely inhuman image of them while hiding their positive contributions to history. The term was first used by French writer Arthur Lévy in his 1893 work Napoléon Intime, in contrast to the expression "Golden Legend" that had been in circulation around Europe since the publication of a book of that name during the Middle Ages.

Black legends have been perpetrated against many nations and cultures, usually as a result of propaganda and xenophobia. For example, the "Spanish Black Legend" is the theory that anti-Spanish political propaganda, whether about Spain, the Spanish Empire or Hispanic America, was sometimes "absorbed and converted into broadly held stereotypes" that assumed that Spain was "uniquely evil".

Origins

Historian Manuel Fernández Álvarez defined a black legend as:

According to historian Elvira Roca Barea, the formation of a black legend and its assimilation by the nation that suffers it is a phenomenon observed in all multicultural empires, not just in the Spanish Empire. The black legend of empires would be the result of the following combined factors:

The combined propaganda attacks and efforts of most smaller powers of the time, as well as defeated rivals.
The propaganda created by the many rival power factions within the empire itself against each other as part of their struggle to win more power.
The self-criticism of the intellectual elite, which tends to be larger in larger empires.
The need of the new powers consolidated during the empire's life or after its dissolution to justify their new prevalence and the new order.

The said black legend tends to fade once the next great power is established or once enough time has gone by.

Common elements of black legends

The defining feature of a black legend is that it has been fabricated and propagated intentionally. Black legends also tend to portray their subjects with the following elements:

 Permanent decadence. The subject is shown to be in a constant state of decadence, corruption, or immorality.
 Degenerated or polluted version of something else. The subject is portrayed as an inferior descendant or variant of another civilization, nation, religion, race or people. The latter represents the true, pure, and noble form of whatever the subject should have been. It may be something that reflect well on the Black Legend's creators by comparison
 Accidentality of merit. If the subject's merits cannot be fully erased or hidden, they are minimized by being portrayed as mere luck, opportunism, or exceptions to the rule.
 Obligatory moral actions. Any noble actions done by the subject are portrayed as being out of self-interest or necessity, rather than genuine morality.
 Natural moral inferiority and irredeemable character. There is no hope for the subject to improve, because their defects have been present from the start and innate to their character, and they lack the moral fortitude to overcome them.

Narrations of black legends tend to include strong pathos, combined with a narrative that is easy to follow and emotionally loaded, created by:
 Detailed, gruesome and morbid descriptions of torture and violence, often portrayed as lacking any practical purpose beyond sadistic pleasure.
 Sexual elements, such as extreme sexual depravity, repression or a combination of both.
 Ignorance, as a lack of both intellectual refinement and cultural sophistication.
 Greed and materialism, as well as the willingness to violate taboos, defile the sacred, and forsake morality in pursuit of greed.
 A unifying theme, usually greed, cruelty, sadism or bigotry, that the subject consistently portrays throughout the legend's stories, even if individual instances of "proof" for it may vary or contradict one another.
 Simplicity of elements, often repeating the same anecdotes with minor variations. Any motivating desires provided in the legend are explicitly stated, unambiguously immoral, and do not evolve over time.

Examples

The Spanish Black Legend

Factors that would set the Spanish Black Legend apart from others might include its abnormal permeation and outreach across nations, its racialized component, and its abnormal persistence through time. The causes of this have been suggested as:

The overlap of the period of splendour of the Spanish Empire with the introduction of the printing press in England and Germany, which allowed the propaganda of such colonial and religious rivals to spread faster and wider than ever before and persist in time long after the disappearance of the empire. There is a belief that the Spanish, once known for their savagery, became successful in Catholic conversions because the Natives found the idols similar to their own religion.
Permanence after the dissolution of the empire due to religious factors.
The dismantling and substitution of the Spanish intellectual class by another more favorable to former rival France following the War of the Spanish Succession, which established the French narrative in the country.
The unique characteristics of the colonial wars of the early contemporary period and the need of new colonial powers to legitimize claims in now independent Spanish colonies, as well as the unique and new characteristics of the British Empire that succeeded it.

The hypothesis of a Spanish Black Legend assimilating anti-Hispanic propaganda from the 16th and 17th centuries has a high level of acceptance among specialists, but the extent of its reach and the data it affected, and what may have actually occurred instead, is still debated, especially regarding the Spanish colonization of the Americas, where few written sources have been proven reliable. Historians are now exploring genetic as well as new scientific and statistical investigative techniques.

There is also debate regarding whether the Spanish Black Legend is still in effect today. While some authors like Powell believe that the Black Legend continues to influence modern-day policies and international relationships, other authors, like Henry Kamen, believe it has been left behind. Some have attributed many of the problems between the Episcopal Church and the Latin Community to the Black Legend.

The Russian Black Legend

There is an argument to be made about Russia suffering from a black legend of its own. Forgeries such as The Will of Peter the Great would be part. Lydia Black describes in her work "Russians in Alaska" what she considers part of the development of a Russian black legend.

See also 

Anti-Catholicism
Atrocity propaganda
Black armband view of history, a similar concept in Australia
Black Legend of the Spanish Inquisition
Blood libel
Colonial mentality
Population history of indigenous peoples of the Americas
Historical revisionism
History wars
Information warfare

References

Further reading

Ardolino, Frank. Apocalypse and Armada in Kyd's Spanish Tragedy (Kirksville, Missouri: Sixteenth Century Studies, 1995).
Arnoldsson, Sverker. "La Leyenda Negra: Estudios Sobre Sus Orígines," Göteborgs Universitets Årsskrift, 66:3, 1960

Español Bouché, Luis, "Leyendas Negras: Vida y Obra de Julian Juderías", Junta de Castilla y Leon, 2007.
Gibson, Charles. The Black Legend: Anti-Spanish Attitudes in the Old World and the New. 1971.

Griffin, Eric. "Ethos to Ethnos: Hispanizing 'the Spaniard' in the Old World and the New," The New Centennial Review, 2:1, 2002.
Hadfield, Andrew. "Late Elizabethan Protestantism, Colonialism and the Fear of the Apocalypse," Reformation, 3, 1998.
Hanke, Lewis. The Spanish Struggle for Justice in the Conquest of America. 1949.
Hanke, Lewis. Bartolomé de Las Casas: Bookman, Scholar and Propagandist. 1952.

Kamen, Henry. Empire: How Spain Became a World Power, 1492-1763. New York: HarperCollins. 2003. 
Keen, Benjamin. "The Black Legend Revisited: Assumptions and Realities", Hispanic American Historical Review 49, no. 4 (November 1969): 703–19.
Keen, Benjamin. "The White Legend Revisited: A Reply to Professor Hanke's 'Modest Proposal,'" Hispanic American Historical Review 51, no. 2 (May 1971): 336–55.

Lock, Julian. "'How Many Tercios Has the Pope?' The Spanish War and the Sublimation of Elizabethan Anti-Popery," History, 81, 1996.
Maltby, William S., The Black Legend in England. Duke University Press, Durham, 1971, .
Maura, Juan Francisco. "La hispanofobia a través de algunos textos de la conquista de América: de la propaganda política a la frivolidad académica". Bulletin of Spanish Studies 83. 2 (2006): 213–240.
Maura, Juan Francisco. "Cobardía, crueldad y oportunismo español: algunas consideraciones sobre la 'verdadera' historia de la conquista de la Nueva España". Lemir (Revista de literatura medieval y del Renacimiento) 7 (2003): 1–29. 
Mignolo, W. D. (2007). "What does the Black Legend Have to do with Race?" Rereading the Black Legend: The Discourses of Religious and Racial Difference in the Renaissance Empires, 312–24.
Powell, Philip Wayne, Tree of Hate: Propaganda and Prejudices Affecting United States Relations with the Hispanic World. Basic Books, New York, 1971, .

Sanchez, M.G., Anti-Spanish Sentiment in English Literary and Political Writing, 1553–1603 (Phd Diss; University of Leeds, 2004)
Schmidt, Benjamin, Innocence Abroad. The Dutch Imagination and the New World, 1570–1670, Cambridge U.P. 2001, 

1893 introductions
1890s neologisms
Anti-Catholicism in the United Kingdom
Anti-Catholicism in the United States
Anti-Spanish sentiment
Historiography
Spanish Inquisition
History of the Philippines (1565–1898)
History of the Philippines (1898–1946)
Spanish–American War
Black propaganda
Political forgery
Spanish Empire
Propaganda legends